The 76th Group Army, formerly the 21st Group Army, is a military formation of the Chinese People's Liberation Army Ground Forces (PLAGF). The 76th Group Army is one of twelve total group armies of the PLAGF, the largest echelon of ground forces in the People's Republic of China, and one of three assigned to the nation's Western Theater Command.

History 
The unit served during the Korean War when it comprised the 61st, 62nd, and 63rd Divisions.

References

Field armies of the People's Liberation Army
Military units and formations established in 1949